Stelian Tănase (born  February 17, 1952) is a Romanian writer, journalist, political analyst, and talk show host. Tănase was from November 2013 to October 2015 the president of TVR. Having briefly engaged in politics during the early 1990s, after the fall of the Communist regime, he has remained a leading figure of the Romanian civil society.

Stelian Tănase founded 22 magazine in January 1990 and was its first editor-in-chief. A founding member of both the Group for Social Dialogue and the Civic Alliance, Stelian Tănase was the latter's vice-president between 1991 and 1993. In 1992, he founded Sfera Politicii; he is a managing editor of both, as well as a regular contributor to various Romanian newspapers. Over the years, he was the host of several talk shows (2 plus 1 and Orient express for Antena 1; Maşina de tocat for TVR 1; Zece şi un sfert, Zece fix, Tănase şi Dinescu, and 3 X 3 for Realitatea TV).

Tănase is also vocal in the campaign to declassify all files kept in Securitate archives; in March 2002, he invited on his talk show a discussion his best friend, after it was revealed that the latter had been a Securitate informant who regularly furnished information on Tănase himself.

Biography
Born in Bucharest, he graduated from the local university's Faculty of Philosophy in 1977. Before 1989, two out of his first three books were banned by the Communist regime censorship apparatus.

Tănase became a public figure soon after the Romanian Revolution of 1989: in 1990, he was one of the main organizers of Piata Universitatii marathon protest, Golaniada, the protest movement against former members of the Romanian Communist Party who had gained power during the Revolution.

After July 1991, Tănase sided with the group inside the Civic Alliance that called for the organization's transformation into a political party. As a member of the newly created Civic Alliance Party inside the opposition alliance (the Romanian Democratic Convention), he was elected to the Chamber of Deputies for the 1992–1996 legislature, representing the city of Bucharest. He was vice-president of the Parliamentary Committee for Foreign Affairs (until April 1995) and member of the Special Committee for the Advancing a Legislative Proposal Regarding the Functioning of Political Parties.

In 2006, he was chosen member of the Presidential Commission for the Study of the Communist Dictatorship in Romania by its president, Vladimir Tismăneanu. The Commission was founded by President Traian Băsescu in order to provide for an official and academic basis for condemning the Romanian communist regime. This took place on December 18, 2006, when the President presented the Commission's 660 pages report to Parliament, making Romania the first Eastern Bloc country to officially condemn its communist regime.

Academia
In 1996, he was granted a Ph.D. in political sociology by the University of Bucharest. A visiting professor at the University of California, Los Angeles Sociology Department in 1997, he currently teaches at the University of Bucharest's Faculty of Political Sciences.

Tănase was the recipient of several fellowships: he was Visiting Short-Term Fellow (1993) and Visiting Scholar (1994) at the Woodrow Wilson International Center for Scholars, granted a Visiting Short Term Collaborative research project at the University of California, Los Angeles (with Gail Kligman in 1996); a Fulbright scholar, post-Ph.D. grant, The New School for Social Research (1997); Visiting Short Term Scholar at the Holocaust Memorial Museum in Washington, D.C. (1998).

He has held conferences in Rome, Paris, Oslo, Vienna, Budapest, Washington, D.C., and also at prestigious American universities: the University of California, Los Angeles, the University of California, Berkeley, Stanford University, New York University, Columbia University, the University of Maryland, and The New School for Social Research.

Works

Novels
 1982 - Luxul melancoliei ("The Luxury of Melancholy"); 2 nd ed. 1993
 1990 - Corpuri de iluminat ("Lighting Bodies"), written 1985-1987; 2 nd ed. 1998, 3 rd ed. 2004
 1995 - Playback; 2 nd ed. 2004
 2008 - Maestro
 2010 - "Dracul şi Mumia" ("The Old Nick and the Mummy)
 2011 - "Moartea unui dansator de tango" ("The death of the tango dancer"), translated into Italian and Spanish
 2012 - "Skepsis. Cartea cu Poveşti". 
 2017 - "Nocturna cu vampir Opus 1". ("Nocturne with a Vampire opus no. 1") 
 2018 - "Partida de vânătoare" ("The Hunting")

Studies and essays
 1993 - Şocuri şi crize ("Shocks and Crises"), collected political articles
 1995 - Ora oficială de iarnă ("Official Winter Time"), diary 1986–1990
 1996 - Sfidarea memoriei. Convorbiri cu Alexandru Paleologu ("Defying Memory. Conversations with Alexandru Paleologu")
 1996 - Revoluţia ca eşec. Elite şi societate ("Revolution as Failure. Elites and Society"), political studies
 1997 - Anatomia mistificării. Procesul Noica-Pillat ("Anatomy of Mystification. The Noica-Pillat Trial")
 1998 - LA vs NY. Jurnal american ("LA vs NY. American Diary")
 1998 - Elite şi societate. Guvernarea Gheorghiu-Dej (1948–1965) ("Elites and Society. The Gheorghiu-Dej Government")
 1999 - Miracolul revoluţiei. O istorie politică a căderii regimurilor comuniste ("The Miracle of Revolution. A Political History of the Fall of Communist Regimes")
 2002 - Acasă se vorbeşte în şoaptă, Dosar & jurnal din anii târzii ai dictaturii ("At Home There is Only Speaking in a Whisper: File and Diary Recording in the Late Years of the Romanian Dictatorship"); contains excerpts from his file at the political police Securitate
 2004 - Zei şi semizei la început de secol ("Gods and Demigods at the Dawn of the Century")
 2005 - Clienţii lu' tanti Varvara. Poveşti clandestine ( "Aunt Varvara's Clients. Clandestine Stories"), translated into English and Spanish
 2017 - "Dinastia" ( "The Dynasty")
 2018 - "Conversaţii cu Regele Mihai" ("Talking with King Michael")

Filmography

Directed
 1991 - Piaţa Univesităţii - România ("University Square - Romania"), documentary

Screenplays
 1999 - Asaltul cerului ("The Siege of the Sky"), documentary for Antena 1; 6 episodes
 2000 - Struma, documentary for Antena 1
 2004 - Vizionarii ("The Foreseers"), portraits of 19th and 20th century Romanian politicians (Mihail Kogălniceanu, Ion Brătianu, Nicolae Iorga, Nicolae Titulescu, Iuliu Maniu), documentary for Realitatea TV; 5 episodes
 2004 - Istoria alegerilor în România secolului XX ("The History of Elections in 20th century Romania"), documentary for Realitatea TV; 6 episodes
 2006 - Dinastia ("The Dynasty"), portraits of the four kings of the Romanians, documentary for the Romanian Television Company; 21 episodes

Honours
  Romanian Royal Family: Knight of the Royal Decoration of the Cross of the Romanian Royal House

References

External links
The Renegade Istrati, excerpt from Aunt Varvara's Clients, translated by Alistair Ian Blyth
 Biography at the Polirom site
Sfera politicii
 Interview in Cariere magazine

1952 births
Living people
Members of the Chamber of Deputies (Romania)
Television people from Bucharest
Romanian political journalists
Romanian film directors
Romanian magazine editors
Romanian memoirists
Romanian novelists
Romanian male novelists
Romanian political scientists
Romanian screenwriters
Romanian television personalities
University of Bucharest alumni
Academic staff of the University of Bucharest
Male screenwriters
Male essayists